Ledri Vula (born 10 July 1986) is a Kosovo-Albanian rapper, singer and songwriter.

Life and career 

Ledri Vula was born on 10 July 1986 to Agron and Xheraldina Vula in the city of Pristina, then part of the Socialist Federal Republic of Yugoslavia, present Kosovo. His father is an Albanian television producer Agron Vula who is from Gjakova, his mother is journalist and television personality Xheraldina Vula, who originally comes from Ulcinj, Montenegro. In 2005, he rose to prominence as one of the member of the hip hop duo Skillz. In 2012, the rise of his own stardom eventually led to the dissolution of the duo. In 2014, Vula launched his solo career starting off in December that year with the release of his debut single "100 Probleme".

In 2016, he won the My Music Hit of the Year Award at the Top Music Awards 2016. In 2019, he performed at the Sunny Hill Festival in Pristina sharing a stage with other acclaimed artists such as Calvin Harris, Miley Cyrus and Dua Lipa.

In January 2020, Vula announced his debut studio album, 10/10, to be released later that year. In February 2020, he premiered his follow-up singles "Piano Rap" and "Prej Inati", whereas during the summer he premiered two other songs where both of them where features, the first one was "DMP" featuring Capital T, and "Aman" featuring Lumi B & Dafina Zeqiri.

Activism  

Following the earthquake in Albania on 26 November 2019, Vula and his family offered immediate relief activities and the family-owned residences in Pristina to the families and victims affected by the seismicity. In May 2020, he expressed his support to the Black Lives Matter movement in connection with the wider George Floyd protests. Later that year, he extended his support to the Albanian campaign, Liria ka emër, which was created following the confirmation of an indictment on war crimes against several Albanian figures of the Kosovo Liberation Army (UÇK) by the Specialist Chambers in The Hague.

Discography 

 10/10 (2020)

References

External links 

1986 births
21st-century Albanian rappers
21st-century Albanian male singers
Albanian activists
Albanian songwriters
Albanian-language singers
Kosovan people of Albanian descent
Kosovan rappers
Kosovan singers
Living people
Musicians from Pristina